Shimona Nelson (born 1 December 1998) is a Jamaican netball player in the Suncorp Super Netball league, playing for the Collingwood Magpies.

Career
Nelson broke into the senior Jamaica national netball team in early 2017 in a test series against Barbados and has also represented Jamaica at Under-21 and Fast5 level. Nelson was selected by the Adelaide Thunderbirds as a replacement player for the injured Cat Tuivaiti in the 2018 season, and played most games in a winless season for the Thunderbirds. Nelson moved to Melbourne-based Super Netball team the Collingwood Magpies at end of the season, joining the Magpies squad for two years.

Super Netball statistics
Statistics are correct to the end of the 2018 season.

|- style="background-color: #eaeaea"
! scope="row" style="text-align:center" | 2018
|style="text-align:center;"|Thunderbirds
| 418/474 || 4 || 27 || 0 || 6 || 1 || 7 || 48 || 73 || 14 
|- 
! scope="row" style="text-align:center" | 2019
|style="text-align:center;"|Magpies
| 0/0 || 0 || 0 || 0 || 0 || 0 || 0 || 0 || 0 || 0
|- class="sortbottom"
! colspan=2| Career
! 418/474
! 4
! 27
! 0
! 6
! 1
! 7
! 48
! 73
! 14
|}

Personal life
Nelson currently studies a Bachelor of Psychological Science at Deakin University.

Nelson elected to pursue netball instead of playing college basketball in the United States.

References

External links
 Magpies Netball profile
 Super Netball profile
 Netball Draft Central profile

1998 births
Jamaican netball players
Adelaide Thunderbirds players
Collingwood Magpies Netball players
Living people
Suncorp Super Netball players
Jamaican expatriate netball people in Australia
Commonwealth Games medallists in netball
Commonwealth Games silver medallists for Jamaica
Netball players at the 2022 Commonwealth Games
Sportspeople from Kingston, Jamaica
Medallists at the 2022 Commonwealth Games